Andrew J. Gordon (born April 18, 1990) is an American professional stock car racing driver. He last competed part-time in the NASCAR Camping World Truck Series, driving the No. 49 Ford F-150 for CMI Motorsports.

Racing career

Personal life
Andrew is the nephew of former NASCAR driver Benny Gordon.

Motorsports career results

NASCAR

Camping World Truck Series

 Season still in progress
 Ineligible for series points

References

External links
 

1990 births
Living people
NASCAR drivers
People from DuBois, Pennsylvania
Racing drivers from Pennsylvania